The Texas A&M–Corpus Christi Islanders softball team represents the Texas A&M University–Corpus Christi, located in Corpus Christi, Texas. The Islanders are a member of the Southland Conference and participate in NCAA Division I college softball. The team is currently led by head coach Kristen Zaleski and plays home games at Chapman Field.

Year-by-year results

References:

References

External links
Official Website